Gilberta is a genus of flowering plants in the family Asteraceae.

Species
There is only one known species, Gilberta tenuifolia, endemic to Western Australia.

References

Gnaphalieae
Monotypic Asteraceae genera
Flora of Western Australia
Taxa named by Nikolai Turczaninow
Plants described in 1851